Lamartine is an unincorporated community in Clarion County, Pennsylvania, United States. Lamartine has a post office with ZIP code 16375.

References

Unincorporated communities in Clarion County, Pennsylvania
Unincorporated communities in Pennsylvania